The Dahomeyan Democratic Party (PDD) was the sole legal political party in Dahomey from 1963 until 1965.

History 
The PDD was established on 15 December 1963 by Sourou-Migan Apithy and Justin Ahomadégbé-Tomêtin  following the overthrow of President Hubert Maga in a coup, and replaced the Dahomeyan Unity Party as the country's sole legal party. The party largely represented the interests of the Aja, Fon, Nago and Yoruba people of the south and central parts of the country.

The 18 officers of the political bureau elected during the PDD Constituent Congress, included:

The party won all 42 seats in the 1964 elections. However, when tensions and instability led Sourou-Migan Apithy and Justin Ahomadégbé to resign by the end of November 1965, Tahirou Congacou, president of the National Assembly, assumed the role of interim head of State and dissolved the party on 4 December 1965.

Electoral history

National Assembly elections

References 

Political parties established in 1963
Political parties disestablished in 1965
Defunct political parties in Benin
Parties of one-party systems